The Bürgertheater was a theatre in Vienna.

The Wiener Bürgertheater was erected in 1905 in the Third District (3 Bezirk), at Vordere Zollamtsstraße 13. It was designed by the architects Franz von Krauss and Josef Tölk. The official opening took place on December 7, 1905, with the performance of Der alte Herr (The Old Man), by Beatrice Dvorsky with the mayor of Vienna, Karl Lueger, attending.

The first director was actor and author Oskar Fronz, who managed the theatre until his death in 1925. The venue was unsuccessful in its early years until Fronz adapted the Bürgertheater for operetta performances in 1910 and Edmund Eysler became the house composer. From 1926, Revue-operettas were common, particularly those featuring Karl Farkas and his partner, Fritz Grünbaum. The theatre closed in the early years of World War II, but reopened under the direction of Robert Valberg in 1942.

In September 1945, Franz Stoss was named director, and the Bürgertheater became a satellite theatre of the Theater in der Josefstadt. In 1953, Stoss was followed by Harald Röbbeling who renamed the Bürgertheater Broadwaybühne (Broadway-stage) in an attempt to give it a new direction.  This was unsuccessful causing huge financial losses that forced the theatre to close. The building was subsequently used for, among other purposes, the transmission hub for the American occupying force and a sales exhibition which was previously housed at the Vienna Stock Exchange.

During the 1959-61 great death of the theatres in Vienna - in which the Wiener Stadttheater (in Laudongasse) and the "Scala", the former Johann Strauss Theater, were also affected - the Bürgertheater was demolished in 1960. The headquarters of the Viennese Zentralsparkasse was erected on the site, with a bridge over the adjoining slip road, designed by Arthur Perotti and Anton Potyka.

Premieres
Der unsterbliche Lump by Edmund Eysler, 15 October 1910
Der gute Kamerad by Emmerich Kálmán, 27 October 1911
Der Frauenfresser by Edmund Eysler,  23 December 1911
Der lachende Ehemann by Edmund Eysler, 19 March 1913
Ein Tag im Paradies by Edmund Eysler,  23 December 1913
Frühling am Rhein by Edmund Eysler, 10 October 1914
Die -- oder keine by Edmund Eysler,  9 October 1915
Der berühmte Gabriel by Edmund Eysler, 8 November 1916
Der dunkle Schatz by Edmund Eysler, 14 November 1918
Der fidele Geiger by Edmund Eysler, 17 January 1919
Der ledige Schwiegersohn by Edmund Eysler, 20 April 1923
Clo-Clo by Franz Lehár, 6 March 1924
Das Land der Liebe by Edmund Eysler, 27 August 1926
Ihr erster Ball by Edmund Eysler, 21 November 1929
Donauliebchen by Edmund Eysler,  25 December 1932
Wiener Musik by Edmund Eysler,  22 December 1947

Bibliography 

 Dieter Klein, Martin Kupf, Robert Schediwy, Stadtbildverluste Wien - Ein Rückblick auf fünf Jahrzehnte (Image loss in the city of Vienna - a retrospection through five decades). Vienna, 2005

Sources
Most of the information in this article is taken from the German Wikipedia article.

External links
  Full history of the Bürgertheater and photography from the 1940s.
 Operetta Research Center article on Edmund Eylser

Buildings and structures in Landstraße
Opera houses in Vienna
Cultural venues in Vienna
Theatres in Vienna
Former theatres in Vienna
Theatres completed in 1905
Music venues completed in 1905
1905 establishments in Austria
1960 disestablishments in Austria
Demolished buildings and structures in Austria
Buildings and structures demolished in 1960
20th-century architecture in Austria